Now That's What I Call Music! 2 is the second volume of the Now That's What I Call Music! series in the United States. It was released on July 27, 1999, debuting at number three on the Billboard 200 albums chart. It has been certified 2× Platinum by the RIAA. The compilation includes one song which reached number one on the Billboard Hot 100: "...Baby One More Time".

Reception

Stephen Thomas Erlewine of AllMusic says the album is "a terrific time capsule, at the very least, capturing what American pop radio sounded like in the late '90s" and "an entertaining snapshot of a fleeting era in pop music history".

Track listing

Charts

Weekly charts

Year-end charts

Certifications

References

1999 compilation albums
 002
Virgin Records compilation albums